The large-spotted civet (Viverra megaspila) is a viverrid native to Southeast Asia that is listed as Endangered on the IUCN Red List.

Characteristics
Pocock described the large-spotted civet as varying in colour from silvery-grey to golden-buff or tawny with a black to brown pattern and large or comparatively small spots, which are separated or sometimes fusing into blotches or into vertical stripes behind the shoulders. White bands on the tail are mostly restricted to the sides and lower surface but very seldom form complete rings.

Distribution and habitat
The large-spotted civet occurs in Myanmar, Thailand, Malaysia, Cambodia, Laos, Vietnam and southern China. In China, it was last sighted in 1998. In Thailand, it occurs in several protected areas as far south as Ranong Province.

Ecology and behaviour
Data on feeding ecology and behaviour of large-spotted civet do not exist.

Threats
The large-spotted civet is threatened due to habitat degradation, habitat loss, and hunting with snares and dogs. The population is thought to have been steadily declining throughout the range countries, and in China and Vietnam in particular may have been reduced significantly.
In Chinese and Vietnamese markets, it is in demand as food.

Taxonomic history
Pocock considered V. megaspila and V. civettina to be distinct species. Ellerman and Morrison-Scott considered V. civettina a subspecies of V. megaspila.

References

large-spotted civet
Carnivorans of Asia
Mammals of Southeast Asia
Fauna of Yunnan
Carnivorans of Malaysia
Endangered fauna of Asia
large-spotted civet
large-spotted civet
Endangered Fauna of China